Amelia Hayes may refer to:

Amelia Hayes, owner of Look (modeling agency)
Amelia Hayes, fictional character in Intelligence (U.S. TV series)